Independiente de La Rioja are an Argentine Football club, whose home town is La Rioja, in the La Rioja Province of Argentina. They currently play in Torneo Argentino C

Titles

Liga Riojana de Fútbol: 6
1930, 1932, 1934, 1935, 1944, 1984

See also
List of football clubs in Argentina
Argentine football league system

Football clubs in La Rioja Province, Argentina
Association football clubs established in 1924
1924 establishments in Argentina